Bromley is a former constituency for the House of Commons of the Parliament of the United Kingdom. The most famous MP was Harold Macmillan, Prime Minister, 1957 to 1963.

Like all 20th century such seats for geographic zones it elected one Member of Parliament (MP), under first past the post. It lay in Kent until 1965 and Greater London thereafter.

Boundaries 

1918–1945: The Borough of Bromley, and the Urban Districts of Beckenham and Penge.

1945–1950: Parts of the Boroughs of Bromley and Beckenham, and the Urban District of Penge.

1950–1974: The Borough of Bromley.

The seat overspan the town of Bromley.

As with the rest of south-east London these areas were in the far northwest of the Historic County of Kent – and was in the last such parts to join London, joining Greater London in April 1965.

The seat was abolished in the redistribution which took effect in 1974. The London Borough of Bromley (a larger area than the previous Municipal Borough) was, as to Westminster representation, split into four seats.

History 
This constituency consisted largely of prosperous leafy suburbia and was one of the Conservatives' strongest seats. The character of the area was one of prosperous small businesses, rather than commuting professionals.

Before 1918 this area was mostly the northern part of the Sevenoaks constituency. The first MP for this seat was Henry William Forster, the former member for Sevenoaks. In 1919 he was created the 1st Baron Forster and became Governor-General of Australia in 1920.

The next three MPs were first elected at by-elections (in 1919, 1930 and 1945 respectively).

In 1945 the sitting member died between the day of the election and the declaration of the result, so the opportunity arose for one of the Conservative former ministers defeated in the general election to return to the House of Commons representing an extremely safe seat. Future Prime Minister Harold Macmillan was selected by the Conservative Party to fight the seat. He was perhaps the most famous MP for Bromley, serving from the 1945 by-election until his retirement in 1964, when he was succeeded by John Hunt. Hunt held the seat (renamed Ravensbourne in 1974) until 1997.

Members of Parliament

Election results

Elections in the 1910s

Elections in the 1920s

In the 1930s

In the 1940s

In the 1950s

In the 1960s

In the 1970s

References

 Boundaries of Parliamentary Constituencies 1885-1972, compiled and edited by F.W.S. Craig (Parliamentary Reference Publications 1972)
 British Parliamentary Election Results 1918-1949, compiled and edited by F.W.S. Craig (Macmillan Press, revised edition 1977)
 British Parliamentary Election Results 1950-1973, compiled and edited by F.W.S. Craig (Parliamentary Research Services 1983)
 Who's Who of British Members of Parliament, Volume III 1919-1945, edited by M. Stenton and S. Lees (Harvester Press 1979)
 Who's Who of British Members of Parliament, Volume IV 1945-1979, edited by M. Stenton and S. Lees (Harvester Press 1981)

See also
 List of former United Kingdom Parliament constituencies

Politics of the London Borough of Bromley
Parliamentary constituencies in South East England (historic)
Parliamentary constituencies in Kent (historic)
Constituencies of the Parliament of the United Kingdom established in 1918
Constituencies of the Parliament of the United Kingdom disestablished in 1974
Constituencies of the Parliament of the United Kingdom represented by a sitting Prime Minister